Gibberula punctillum is a species of minute sea snail, a marine gastropod mollusk in the family Cystiscidae family,

Distribution
This marine species is endemic to São Tomé and Príncipe.

References

External links
 MNHN, Paris: holotype

Endemic fauna of São Tomé and Príncipe
Invertebrates of São Tomé and Príncipe
Gastropods described in 1987
Taxonomy articles created by Polbot
punctillum
Taxobox binomials not recognized by IUCN